Pindsultani is a village in Jand Tehsil of Attock District in Punjab Province of Pakistan. It is located at 80 km from Rawalpindi and Islamabad, the country's capital.

Its area is about 44 km2 or 85949 Kanal.

References

Villages in Attock District